Anna Wessman (born 9 October 1989) is a Swedish track and field athlete who competes in the javelin throw. She won the bronze medal at the 2009 European U23 Championships.

Her personal best in the event is 61.42 metres set at Finnkampen in Tampere in 2016.

International competitions

References

1989 births
Living people
Swedish female javelin throwers
People from Växjö
Competitors at the 2015 Summer Universiade
Sportspeople from Kronoberg County